The 2000 Nordic Figure Skating Championships were held on March 3–5, 2000 at the Stavanger Ishall in Stavanger, Norway. The competition was open to elite figure skaters from Nordic countries. Skaters competed in two disciplines, men's singles and ladies' singles, across two levels: senior (Olympic-level) and junior.

Senior results

Men

Ladies

Junior results

Men

Ladies

References

Nordic Figure Skating Championships, 2000
Nordic Figure Skating Championships, 2000
Nordic Figure Skating Championships
International figure skating competitions hosted by Norway
Sport in Stavanger
Winter sports competitions in Norway